Nopo Station is a station of Busan Metro Line 1 located in Nopo-dong, Geumjeong District, Busan, South Korea. The subname in parentheses is Central Bus Terminal.

Station layout

External links
 Cyber station information from Busan Transportation Corporation 

Railway stations opened in 1986
Busan Metro stations
Geumjeong District
1986 establishments in South Korea
20th-century architecture in South Korea